Timanoridas may refer to:
Timanoridas of Corinth, purchaser of Neaira
Timanoridas, an ancient Macedonian